William Austin "Chink" Outen (June 17, 1905 – September 11, 1961) was an American professional baseball catcher. He played in Major League Baseball for the Brooklyn Dodgers in 1933, appearing in 93 games.

Outen attended North Carolina State College, where he played college baseball for the Wolfpack. He played in the minor leagues from 1929 to 1939, appearing in over 1000 games. In the final season of his career, he was a player-manager for the Mayodan Millers in the Bi-State League. Outen was one of several baseball players in the first half of the 20th century with the nickname "Chink".

References

External links

1905 births
1961 deaths
Major League Baseball catchers
Baseball players from North Carolina
Brooklyn Dodgers players
NC State Wolfpack baseball players
Minor league baseball managers
Asheville Tourists players
Jersey City Skeeters players
Albany Senators players
Greenville Spinners players
Scranton Miners players
Buffalo Bisons (minor league) players
Montreal Royals players
Mission Reds players
Hollywood Stars players
Lexington Indians players
Spartanburg Spartans players
Mayodan Millers players
People from Mount Holly, North Carolina